Mo Jae-hyeon (born 24 September 1996) is a South Korean footballer who plays as a midfielder or forward for Gyeongnam FC.

Career

Before the 2017 season, Mo signed for Korean second division side Suwon FC, where he made 54 league appearances and scored 4 goals.

References

External links
 
 

South Korean footballers
Living people
K League 2 players
FC Anyang players
Suwon FC players
Gyeongnam FC players
1996 births
Association football forwards
Association football midfielders